Amaurobius ossa is a species of spider in the family Amaurobiidae, found in Greece.

References

ossa
Spiders of Europe
Spiders described in 1993